Meløyavisa (The Meløy Gazette) is a local Norwegian newspaper published in Nordland county. 

Meløyavisa was established in 1986. The newspaper is published twice a week in Ørnes in the municipality of Meløy, and it covers news in the municipalities of Rødøy, Meløy, and Gildeskål. Its editor is Bente Haldorsen.

Circulation
According to the Norwegian Audit Bureau of Circulations and National Association of Local Newspapers, Meløyavisa has had the following annual circulation:
2004: 3,128
2005: 2,919
2006: 2,796
2007: 2,955
2008: 2,479
2009: 2,533
2010: 2,171
2011: 1,882
2012: 1,939
2013: 1,991
2014: 2,002
2015: 1,872
2016: 1,823

References

External links
Meløyavisa homepage

Newspapers published in Norway
Norwegian-language newspapers
Meløy
Rødøy
Gildeskål
Mass media in Nordland
Newspapers established in 1986
1986 establishments in Norway